Kennedy Marchment (born December 6, 1996) is a Canadian ice hockey forward, currently playing with the Connecticut Whale of the Premier Hockey Federation (PHF).

Playing career 
Across 142 NCAA games with the St. Lawrence Saints women's ice hockey program, Marchment scored 154 points, being named a top-10 finalist for the 2017 Patty Kazmaier Award.

She was selected 2nd overall by the Buffalo Beauts in the 2017 NWHL Draft.

In 2018–19, her rookie season in the Swedish Women's Hockey League (SDHL), Marchment put up 52 points in 36 games, as her team, Linköping HC Dam, made it to the SDHL finals, where they lost to Luleå HF/MSSK. The next season, she switched teams to play for HV71 and put up 64 points in 36 games, good for second in league scoring. She was named a finalist for the Forward of the Year Award.

International 
Marchment was invited to Team Canada's selection camp for the 2014 IIHF World Women's U18 Championship, but was not selected.

Personal life 
Marchment is the niece of former NHL player Bryan Marchment, cousin of Dallas Stars forward Mason Marchment.

Career statistics

References

External links

1996 births
Living people
Canadian expatriate ice hockey players in Sweden
Canadian expatriate ice hockey players in the United States
Canadian ice hockey right wingers
Canadian women's ice hockey forwards
Connecticut Whale (PHF) players
HV71 Dam players
Ice hockey people from Ontario
Linköping HC Dam players
Sportspeople from Clarington
St. Lawrence Saints women's ice hockey players
St. Lawrence University alumni
21st-century Canadian women